"Come with Us" / "The Test" is a double A-side single from the Chemical Brothers' fourth studio album, Come with Us (2002). The vocals in "The Test" are performed by Richard Ashcroft. When released, the single reached number 11 in Spain, number 14 in the United Kingdom, and number 36 in Ireland. In Italy and the United States, only "Come with Us" was released, peaking at number 41 on the Italian Singles Chart and number eight on the Billboard Dance Club Songs chart.

The spoken-word intro from "Come with Us" is sampled from "The Evidence" by Evidence while "The Test" contains a sample from "Pielgrzym" by Polish singer Czesław Niemen, first released in 1972. In Japan, the two songs were swapped in the single title, making the single's title "The Test" / "Come with Us".

"The Test"

Music video
The music video for "The Test" features actress Holly Weston and is directed by Nick Goffey and Dominic Hawley.

The video begins with a woman, played by Weston, swimming deep underwater. Weston is then approached by a whale, which she then swims into the mouth of. She then sees a large amount of jellyfish, which flash multi colours matching the song's beat. The woman then sees rays of light coming from the water's surface and swims towards the rays. She is then seen emerging from a well onto a shingle beach, where the sun quickly rises behind her. The woman then slowly walks down the beach, as a separate scene of the same woman in a nightclub flashes on and off screen. Then the woman sees a young girl running down the beach wearing a red coat.

The video then cuts to a scene which appears to show the woman's hand turning into smoke as she slowly arcs her left arm from right to left, with the beach in complete darkness with white strobe lights in the background. Weston then begins to follow the girl in the red coat seen earlier until they stop at a large expanse of grass with a disused railway track running through the middle and some wooden huts in the distance. The woman then appears to see a young boy holding a hula hoop around a levitating girl's waist, after which the two disappear, leaving behind the boy's cape. The woman then arrives at an old barn to find the girl in the red coat standing there, looking towards the barn. The woman then looks at the girl's face, and the girl is revealed to be a Cyclops. After that, the barn's side appears to come loose and crashes to the ground, sending up a cloud of dust, after which the video then goes back to the nightclub, and it is revealed that all the previous events were in the woman's imagination, either a daydream or as a result of taking hallucinogenic drugs. After that, there is a scene where the camera is moving rapidly and strobe lights flash onto some wooden structures on the beach. Then the video quickly goes into reverse and then ends back at the opening scene.

Track listings

UK and Australian CD single
 "Come with Us" (edit)
 "The Test" (edit)
 "Come with Us" (Fatboy Slim remix)

UK 12-inch single
A1. "Come with Us"
A2. "Come with Us" (Fatboy Slim remix)
B1. "H.I.A"

UK DVD single
 "The Test" (video)
 "Come with Us" (audio—edit)
 "H.I.A" (audio)
 "Hey Boy Hey Girl" (excerpts / live video)

European CD single
 "Come with Us" (edit)
 "The Test" (edit)

US 12-inch single
A1. "Come with Us"
A2. "H.I.A"
B1. "Come with Us" (Fatboy Slim remix)
B2. "Come with Us" (H Foundation remix)

Japanese CD single
 "The Test" (edit)
 "Come with Us" (edit)
 "Come with Us" (Fatboy Slim remix)

Credits and personnel
Credits are lifted from the Come with Us album booklet.

Studios
 Recorded at Miloco Studios (South London, England)
 Edited in the Miloco Studios basement
 Mastered at The Exchange (London, England)

Personnel

 The Chemical Brothers – production
 Tom Rowlands – writing
 Ed Simons – writing
 Tony Rallo – writing on "Come with Us" (from "The Evidence")
 Copperman – writing on "Come with Us" (from "The Evidence")
 Peter Krissen – writing on "Come with Us" (from "The Evidence")
 David Fairstein – writing on "Come with Us" (from "The Evidence")
 Richard Ashcroft – writing on "The Test"
 Czesław Niemen – writing on "The Test" (from "Pielgrzym")
 Steve Dub – engineering
 Greg Fleming – assistant engineering
 Cheeky Paul – editing
 Mike Marsh – mastering

Charts

Release history

References

2001 songs
2002 singles
Astralwerks singles
The Chemical Brothers songs
Songs written by Richard Ashcroft
Virgin Records singles